Jeong is a Latin alphabet rendition of the Korean family name "정", also often spelled Chung, Jung, Joung or Jong. As of the South Korean census of 2015, there were 2,407,601 people by this name in South Korea or 4.84% of the population. The Korean family name "정" is mainly derived from three homophonous hanja.

Latin-alphabet spelling
In a study by the National Institute of the Korean Language based on a sample of year 2007 applications for South Korean passports, it was found that 48.6% of people with this surname chose to have it spelled in Latin letters as Jung in their passports. The Revised Romanization transcription Jeong was at second place with 37.0%, while Chung came in third at 9.2%. It was the only one out of the top five surnames (the others being Kim, Park, Lee, and Choi) for which the Revised Romanization spelling was used by more than a few percent of applicants.

Rarer alternative spellings (the remaining 5.2%) included, in order of decreasing frequency, Joung, Cheong, Chong, Jeoung, Jeung, Choung, Jong, Cheung, Juong, Jeng, Chyung, Jaung, Jueng, and Zheng. The spelling Jong, rare in South Korea, is official in North Korea's modified version of the McCune–Reischauer transcription system.

Lineages
The Korean family name Jeong can be written with any of three homophonous hanja. Each of those three are broken down into a number of clans, identified by their bon-gwan (clan hometown, not necessarily the actual residence of the clan members), which indicate different lineages.

Most common (鄭)
 (나라 정 nara jeong) is the most common of the three Jeong names. According to Samguksagi, this character was given to Jibaekho (지백호) who was the chief of one chiefdom among six chiefdoms as surname by the King Yuri in early Silla era. Historically, 鄭 was officially written as Tyeng In the 2015 South Korean census, 2,010,117 people (4.16%) and 626,265 households had this family name. These people identified with 136 different bon-gwan (not including those listed as "other" or "unreported" in the census). Some examples of these clans are Dongnae, Gyeongju, Jinju, Yeonil, Hadong, Naju, Chogye, Cheongju and Haeju.

Second-most common (丁)
 (고무래 정 gomurae jeong; 장정 정 jangjeong jeong) is the second-most common of the three Jeong names. In the 2015 census, 187,975 people (0.47%) and 58,431 households had this family name. These people identified with 23 different bon-gwan, including:
Naju: 82,863 people and 25,786 households. 
Jinju: 24,598 people and 7,661 households.
Yeonggwang: 21,774 people and 6,839 households.
Changwon: 16,141 people and 4,989 households.
Yeongseong: 10,429 people and 3,279 households.
Gukseong: 9,620 people and 2,984 households.
Haeju: 5,381 people and 1,683 households.
Aphae (押海): 3,335 people and 1,079 households. They claim descent from Jeong Deok-seong (정덕성; 丁德盛; Pinyin: Dīng Déshèng), who was born in a village called Dingying (丁營) in Dengzhou, China and came to the Korean peninsula during the reign of Munjong of Goryeo. Later on, some Jeong clans branched off from them, and became more numerous.
Other or unreported: 13,834 people and 4,131 households.

Least common (程)
 (한도 정 hando jeong; 길 정 gil jeong) is the least-common of the three Jeong names. In the 2015 census, 32,519 people and 10,220 households had this family name. These people identified with 15 different bon-gwan, including:
Dongnae: 10,632 people and 3,321 households.
Gyeongju: 9,026 people and 2,934 households.
Hanam: 7,766 people and 2,355 households.
Other or unreported: 5,095 people and 1,610 households.

Notable people of the past
The following is a list of notable people of the past with the Korean family name Jeong. People should only be included in this list if they have their own Wikipedia articles or if they are discussed in a non-trivial fashion in Wikipedia articles on notable groups or events with which they are associated.

Jeong Jung-bu  (1106–1179), Goryeo Dynasty soldier and military dictator
Jeong Mong-ju  (1337–1392), Goryeo Dynasty minister and writer
Jeong Do-jeon  (1342–1398), Joseon Dynasty politician
Jeong In-ji    (1396–1478), Joseon Dynasty Neo-Confucian scholar who wrote the colophon of the Hunmin Jeong-eum Haerye
Jeong Hyun-jo  (1440–1504), Joseon Dynasty politician and writer
Hadong Budaebuin (1522–1567), Joseon Dynasty Grand Internal Princess Consort and the biological mother of King Seonjo
Jeong Nan-jeong  (1525-1565), Joseon Dynasty philosopher, concubine of Prime Minister Yun Won-hyung
Jeong In-hong  (1535–1623), Joseon Dynasty Neo-Confucian scholar and writer
Jeong Cheol    (1536–1593), Joseon Dynasty statesman and poet
Jeong Gu       (1543–1620), Joseon Dynasty philosopher, politician, historian and writer
Jeong Yeo-rip  (1546–1589), Joseon Dynasty politician
Jeong Bal      (1553–1592), Joseon Dynasty naval captain
Jeong Ki-ryong (1562–1622), Joseon Dynasty general
Jeong Mun-bu   (1565–1624), Joseon Dynasty statesman who formed a militia to resist Japanese invasion
Jeong Rip      (1574–1629), Joseon Dynasty scholar-official, diplomat, and ambassador
Jeong Seon     (1676–1759), Joseon Dynasty landscape painter
Jeong Ji-hae   (fl. 1748),  Joseon Dynasty archaeologist
Jeong Yak-yong (1762–1836), Joseon Dynasty Silhak philosopher
Jeong Yak-jong (1760–1801), also Augustine Chong, Roman Catholic Korean bishop and martyr
Paul Chong Hasang (1794 or 1795–1839), Roman Catholic Korean saint

Notable people of recent times 
The following is a list of notable people in recent history with the Korean family name Jeong or any of its variants. Individuals are grouped by area of notability and then ordered by year of birth. Names are presented in the form they are given on the respective articles, which may have the family name first or last, or which may be a stage name or pen name. For the selection rules, see the previous section.

Business
Chung Ju-yung (1915–2001), South Korean entrepreneur, businessman and founder of Hyundai Group
Chung Mong-koo (born 1938), South Korean businessman and honorary chairman of Hyundai Motor Group, son of Chung Ju-yung
Chung Joon-yang (born 1948), South Korean businessman, former chairman of POSCO
Chung Mong-hun (1948–2003), South Korean businessman, son of Chung Ju-yung
Chung Mong-joon (born 1951), South Korean businessman and politician, son of Chung Ju-yung
Chung Mong-won (born 1955), South Korean businessman, CEO of Halla Group and Mando Corporation
Chung Mong-gyu (born 1961), South Korean businessman and chairman of HDC Group, nephew of Chung Ju-yung
Chung Yong-jin (born 1968), South Korean businessman, vice-chairman and former CEO of Shinsegae
Chung Eui-sun (born 1970), South Korean businessman and chairman of Hyundai Motor Group, son of Chung Mong-koo
Soo Chung, Jin-Nam Chung and Ki Y. Chung, co-owners of a Washington, D.C. dry-cleaning company, defendants in the so-called "$54 million pants lawsuit" (Pearson v. Chung)

Classical music and dance
Myung-wha Chung (born 1944), South Korean cellist and university professor
Kyung Wha Chung (born 1948), South Korean violinist
Soon-Mi Chung (born 1952), South Korean-born Norwegian musician and musical director
Myung-whun Chung (born 1953), South Korean pianist and conductor
Young-jae Jung (born 1984), South Korean ballet dancer

Design and visual arts
Chung Sanghwa (born 1932), South Korean minimalist and Dansaekhwa painter
Chung Yangmo (born 1934), South Korean art historian, former director of the National Museum of Korea
Peter Chung (born Jeong Geun-sik, 1961), Korean American animator
Doo-Ri Chung (born 1971), Korean American fashion designer
Mimi Jung (born 1981), South Korean artist
Young Yang Chung, South Korean textile historian and embroiderer

Entertainment industry

Screen actors
Jung Hye-sun (born 1942), South Korean actress
Jung Dong-hwan (born 1949), South Korean actor
Jeong Yun-hui (born 1954), former South Korean actress
Jung Han-yong (born 1954), South Korean actor
Jung Ae-ri (born 1960), South Korean actress
Jeong Bo-seok (born 1961), South Korean actor
Jung Ho-keun (born 1964), South Korean actor
Jung Jin-young (born 1964), South Korean actor
Jung Eun-pyo (born 1966), South Korean actor
Jung In-gi (born 1966), South Korean actor
Sora Jung (born Kim Seo-ra, 1968), South Korean actress
Ken Jeong (born 1969), American comedian, actor, and physician of Korean descent
Jung Jae-young (born Jeong Ji-hyeon, 1970), South Korean actor
Jung Joon-ho (born 1970), South Korean actor
Jung Chan (born 1971), South Korean actor
Jung Woong-in (born 1971), South Korean actor
Jung Kyung-ho (born 1972), South Korean actor
Jung Hye-young (born 1973), South Korean actress
Jung Woo-sung (born 1973), South Korean actor
Jung Man-sik (born 1974), South Korean actor
Jeong Ga-eun (born Baek Ra-hee, 1978), South Korean actress
Jung Joon (born 1979), South Korean actor
Jeong Da-bin (1980–2007), South Korean actress
Jung Ryeo-won (born 1981), Korean-Australian actress and singer
Jung Gyu-woon (born 1982), South Korean actor
Jung Tae-woo (born 1982), South Korean actor
Charlet Chung (born Chihye Takahashi Chung, 1983), American actress
Jamie Chung (born 1983), American actress and television personality of Korean descent
Jung Kyung-ho (born 1983), South Korean actor
Jung Yu-mi (born 1983), South Korean actress
Jeong Yu-mi (born 1984), South Korean actress
Jung Eui-chul (born 1985), South Korean actor and model
Jung Suk-won (born 1985), South Korean actor
Jung Eun-chae (born 1986), South Korean actress, model, and TV host
Jung Eun-woo (born 1986), South Korean actor
Min Hyo-rin (born Jung Eun-ran, 1986), South Korean actress, model and singer
Jung Il-woo (born 1987), South Korean actor
Jung Hae-in (born 1988), South Korean actor
Jung So-min (born Kim Yoon-ji, 1989), South Korean actress
Jung Min-ah (born 1994), South Korean actress
Jung Da-bin (born 2000), South Korean actress
Jung Yoon-seok (born 2003), South Korean actor
Byron Chung, South Korean actor

Voice actors
Chung Misook (born 1962), South Korean voice actress
Jeong Nam (born 1968), South Korean voice actress
Jeong Jae-heon (born 1975), South Korean voice actor
Jeong Yeong-wung (born 1979), South Korean voice actor

Film directors, producers and screenwriters
Jung Jin-woo (born 1938), South Korean film director and producer
Chung Ji-young (born 1946), South Korean film director and screenwriter
Jung Sung-il (born 1959), South Korean film critic, director and screenwriter
Jeong Yoon-soo (born 1962), South Korean film director
Jung Seung-hye (1965–2009), South Korean film producer
Jung Doo-hong (born 1966), South Korean action director, martial arts choreographer and stunt coordinator
Jeong Yeon-shik (born 1967), South Korean film director, screenwriter and webtoonist
Jung Ji-woo (born 1968), South Korean film director
Jung Yoo-kyung (born 1968), South Korean television screenwriter
Jeong Jae-eun (born 1969), South Korean film director
Jeong Yong-ki (born 1970), South Korean film director and scriptwriter
Jeong Yoon-cheol (born 1971), South Korean film director
Jeon Yun-su (born 1971), South Korean film director and scriptwriter
Lee Isaac Chung (born 1978), American film director and screenwriter of Korean descent

Singers
Jung Jae-hyung (born 1970), South Korean singer-songwriter, pianist and film composer
Seo Taiji (born Jeong Hyeon-cheol, 1972), South Korean singer-songwriter, musician and record producer, former member and frontman of boy band Seo Taiji and Boys
J (born Chung Jae-young, 1977), Korean-American singer
Shin Hye-sung (born Jung Pil-kyo, 1979), South Korean singer-songwriter, member of boy band Shinhwa
Jung Dong-ha (born Jung Jae-hwan, 1980), South Korean singer, musical actor, radio personality, vocal major professor, and former member of rock band Boohwal
Rain (born Jung Ji-hoon, 1982), South Korean singer-songwriter, dancer, actor and record producer
Jung Yoon-hak (born 1984), South Korean singer, actor and model, member of boy band Supernova
Jung Yu-ri (born 1984), South Korean singer
Yunho (born Jung Yun-ho, 1986), South Korean singer-songwriter and actor, member of pop duo TVXQ
Clara Chung (born 1987), American singer-songwriter, producer and composer of Korean descent
G.O. (born Jung Byung-hee, 1987), South Korean singer-songwriter and actor, member of boy band MBLAQ
Jessica Jung (born 1989), Korean-American singer-songwriter, actress, author and businesswoman, former member of girl group Girls' Generation
Jung Joon-young (born 1989), South Korean retired singer-songwriter, musician, actor, radio DJ and television personality
Jung Yong-hwa (born 1989), South Korean singer, musician, and actor, member of rock band CNBLUE
Jung Ha-na (born 1990), former South Korean singer and actress
Joo (born Jung A-rin, 1990), South Korean singer-songwriter and musical actress
Leo (born Jung Taek-woon, 1990), South Korean singer-songwriter and musical theatre actor, member of boy band VIXX
Jeong Jin-woon (born 1991), South Korean singer and actor, member of boy band 2AM
Jung Jin-young (born 1991), South Korean singer-songwriter, record producer and actor, former member of boy band B1A4
Nicole Jung (born 1991), South-Korean-American singer and actress, former member of girl group Kara
Jung Eun-ji (born Jeong Hye-rim, 1993), South Korean singer-songwriter, actress, radio DJ and voice actress, member of girl group Apink
Jung Dae-hyun (born 1993), South Korean singer and actor, former member of boy band B.A.P
J-Hope (born Jung Ho-seok, 1994), South Korean rapper, dancer, songwriter and record producer, member of boy band BTS
Jung Il-hoon (born 1994), South Korean rapper, songwriter, record producer and actor, former member of boy band BtoB
Krystal Jung (born Chrystal Soo Jung, 1994), Korean-American singer and actress, member of girl group f(x)
Wheein (born Jung Whee-in, 1995), South Korean singer, member of girl group Mamamoo
Heyoon Jeong (born Jeong Hye-yoon, 1996), South Korean singer, dancer, rapper and choreographer, member of global pop group Now United
Yerin (born Jung Ye-rin, 1996), South Korean singer and actress, former member of girl group GFriend
Eunha (born Jung Eun-bi, 1997), South Korean singer and actress, member of girl group Viviz and former member of GFriend
Jaehyun (born Jeong Jae-hyun, 1997), South Korean singer and actor, member of boy band NCT
Jeong Se-woon (born 1997), South Korean singer-songwriter
Jung Chae-yeon (born 1997), South Korean singer and actress, member of girl group DIA
Eunwoo (born Jung Eun-woo, 1998), South Korean singer, former member of girl groups Pristin and Hinapia
Jung Chan-woo (born 1998), South Korean singer and actor, member of boy band iKon
Wooseok (born Jung Woo-seok, 1998), South Korean rapper, singer-songwriter and model, member of boy band Pentagon
Koo Chung, Korean-American Christian singer-songwriter

Other entertainers
Jeong Jun-ha (born 1971), South Korean comedian and entertainer
Jae Chong (born 1972), American music producer of Korean descent
Jung Hyung-don (born 1978), South Korean comedian and television host
Wonho Chung (born 1980), Korean-Vietnamese comedian and television personality
Fantasy (born Jung Myung-hoon, 1991), South Korean professional League of Legends player
Jung So-ra (born 1991), South Korean beauty pageant titleholder, winner of Miss Korea 2010
Chyung Eun-ju (born 1993), South Korean beauty pageant titleholder
Sungha Jung (born 1996), South Korean acoustic guitarist

Journalism
Natalie Chung (born 1962), Canadian news anchor and journalist of Korean descent
Sarah Jeong (born 1988), Korean-American journalist

Literature
Jeong Ji-yong (1902– 1950), Korean poet and translator of English poetry
Jung Hansuk (1922–1997), South Korean writer and literary critic
Jeong Ho-seung (born 1950), South Korean poet
Jung Chan (born 1953), South Korean writer
Jeong Do-sang (born 1960), South Korean novelist and children's author
Jung Mikyung (1960–2017), South Korean novelist
Ook Chung (born 1963), Japanese-born Canadian writer of Korean descent
Jung Young-moon (born 1965), South Korean writer
Jane Jeong Trenka (born 1972), South Korean-born American writer and adoptees' rights activist
Jeong Yi-hyeon (born 1972), South Korean novelist
Nicole Chung (born 1981), American writer and editor of Korean descent
Catherine Chung, American novelist of Korean descent
Jung Eun-gwol, South Korean novelist
Philip W. Chung, Korean-American playwright

Politics and government
Chung Chil-sung (1897–1958), Korean dancer, feminist and independence activist
Chung Il-kwon (1917–1994), South Korean politician, diplomat, and soldier, general in the Republic of Korea Army and 8th Prime Minister of South Korea (1964–1970)
Chung Eun-yong (1923–2014), South Korean policeman and activist
Chung Won-shik (1928-2020), South Korean politician, educator, soldier and author, 21st Prime Minister of South Korea (1991–1992)
Jeong Seung-hwa (1929–2002), South Korean general officer and 22nd Republic of Korea Army Chief of Staff
Chung Ho-yong (born 1932), South Korean army general and politician
Chung Hong-won (born 1944), South Korean politician and lawyer, 38th Prime Minister of South Korea (2013–2015)
Jeong Se-hyun (born 1945), South Korean politician, Unification Minister from 2002-2004
Chung Un-chan (born 1947), South Korean politician and economist, 36th Prime Minister of South Korea (2009–2010)
Chung Dong-young (born 1953), South Korean politician
Jeong Seung-jo (born 1953), South Korean military officer and 37th Chairman of the Joint Chiefs of Staff of the Republic of Korea Armed Forces
Chung Doo-un (1957-2019), South Korean politician, Vice-Mayor of Seoul from 2000–2003
Roy Chung (born Chung Ryeu Sup,  1957), South Korean-born American soldier believed to have defected to North Korea after the Korean War
Choung Byoung-gug (born 1958), South Korean politician, former Minister of Culture, Sports and Tourism
Chi Hyun Chung (born 1970), Korean-Bolivian politician, doctor, evangelical pastor and political scientist
Jeong Yol (born Jeong Min-suk, 1978), South Korean LGBT rights activist
Jeong Kwang-il, North Korean defector and media smuggler
Jong Thae-yang, North Korean diplomat

Religion
Chai-Sik Chung (born 1930), Korean-born American social ethicist and sociologist of religion
Nicholas Cheong Jin-suk (1931–2021), South Korean Cardinal of the Roman Catholic Church
Chung Hyun Kyung (born 1956), South Korean lay theologian of the Presbyterian Church of Korea

Science
Jae U. Jung (born 1960), South Korean-born American molecular biologist
Chung Hyung-min (born 1964), South Korean biotechnology professor
Sang-Wook Cheong, Korean-American materials scientist

Sports

Football
Chung Kook-chin (1917–1976), South Korean forward and manager
Chung Nam-sik (1917–2005), South Korean striker, manager and Olympic athlete
Chung Yeong-hwan (born 1938), South Korean football player
Jung Byung-tak (1942-2016), South Korean forward and manager
Jung Hae-seong (born 1958), South Korean manager and former football player
Chung Hae-won (1959-2020), South Korean forward and coach
Chung Yong-hwan (1960-2015), South Korean centre-back and manager
Chung Jong-soo (born 1961), South Korean defender
Jeong Gi-dong (born 1961), South Korean goalkeeper
Chung Jong-son (born 1966), South Korean midfielder
Jung Sung-hoon (born 1968), South Korean defender
Chung Sang-nam (born 1969), South Korean football manager, former forward and Olympic athlete
Jung Jeong-soo (born 1969), South Korean midfielder
Jung Jae-kwon (born 1970), South Korean left winger and coach
Jung Kwang-seok (born 1970), South Korean football manager and retired defender
Jung Kwang-min (born 1976), South Korean midfielder
Chung Seok-keun (born 1977), South Korean forward
Chung Yoo-suk (born 1977), South Korean goalkeeper
Jeong Shung-hoon (born 1979), South Korean striker
Jung Yong-hoon (1979–2003), South Korean midfielder
Chung Kyung-ho (born 1980), South Korean left winger and Olympic athlete
Jung Jong-kwan (1981–2011), South Korean midfielder
Jung Jung-suk (1982–2011), South Korean midfielder and forward
Jung Hong-youn (born 1983), South Korean defender and midfielder
Jong Tae-se (born 1984), Japanese-born Korean forward
Jung Ho-jin (born 1984), South Korean centre-back
Jung Jo-gook (born 1984), South Korean striker and coach
Jung Yoon-sung (born 1984), South Korean forward
Jeong Kwang-sik (born 1985), South Korean forward
Jung Hoon (born 1985), South Korean centre-back and defensive midfielder
Jung Min-mu (born 1985), South Korean forward
Jung Sang-Hoon (born 1985), South Korean midfielder
Jung Sung-ryong (born 1985), South Korean goalkeeper
Jeong Hyuk (born 1986), South Korean midfielder
Jung Chul-woon (born 1986), South Korean centre-back
Jung In-whan (born 1986), South Korean centre-back
Jung Myung-oh (born 1986), South Korean defensive midfielder and centre-back
Jong Su-hyok (born 1987), North Korean midfielder
Jung Da-hwon (born 1987), South Korean wing-back
Jung Dae-sun (born 1987), South Korean striker
Jung Eui-do (born 1987), South Korean goalkeeper
Jung Soo-jong (born 1987), South Korean forward and defender
Jeong Ho-jeong (born 1988), South Korean defender
Jeong Seok-min (born 1988), South Korean midfielder
Jeong Woo-in (born 1988), South Korean midfielder
Jong Chol-min (born 1988), North Korean striker
Jung Keun-hee (born 1988), South Korean defender
Chung Woon (born 1989), South Korean left-back
Jeong Jun-yeon (born 1989), South Korean defender
Jeong San (born 1989), South Korean goalkeeper
Jung Seon-ho (born 1989), South Korean midfielder
Jung Sung-min (born 1989), South Korean forward
Jung Woo-young (born 1989), South Korean defensive midfielder and Olympic bronze medallist
Jung Jae-yong (born 1990), South Korean defensive midfielder
Jung Ji-soo (born 1990), South Korean striker
Jung Seol-bin (born Jung Hae-in, 1990), South Korean forward
Jung Seok-hwa (born 1991), South Korean winger
Jung Seung-yong (born 1991), South Korean wing-back
Jong Il-gwan (born 1992), North Korean striker
Jung Gi-woon (born 1992), South Korean forward
Jung Min-woo (born 1992), South Korean forward
Jung Seung-hyun (born 1994), South Korean centre-back
Jeong Seung-won (born 1997), South Korean midfielder and wing-back
Jeong Tae-wook (born 1997), South Korean defender
Jeong Woo-yeong (born 1999), South Korean forward and attacking midfielder
Jeong Sang-bin (born 2002), South Korean forward

Baseball
Chung Min-tae (born 1970), South Korean pitcher and coach
Jung Soo-keun (born 1973), South Korean outfielder and Olympic bronze medallist
Chong Tae-hyon (born 1978), South Korean pitcher and Olympic gold medallist
Jong Hyun-wook (born 1978), South Korean relief pitcher
Jung Sung-ki (born 1979), South Korean pitcher
Jeong Seong-hoon (born 1980), South Korean first and third baseman
Jung Jae-hoon (born 1980), South Korean starting pitcher
Chung Jae-hun (born 1981), South Korean pitcher
Jeong Keun-woo (born 1982), South Korean baseball second baseman and shortstop, and Olympic gold medallist
Jung Woo-ram (born 1985), South Korean relief pitcher
Jung Ju-hyeon (born 1990), South Korean center fielder and second baseman
Jung Soo-bin (born 1990), South Korean outfielder

Basketball
Jeong Myung-hee (born 1964), South Korean basketball player and Olympic athlete
Chung Eun-soon (born 1971), South Korean basketball player and Olympic gold medallist
Jung Sun-min (born 1974), South Korean basketball player and Olympic gold medallist
Jung Mi-ran (born 1985), South Korean basketball player and Olympic athlete

Boxing and martial arts
Chung Yong-taek (1921–2006), South Korean martial artist, 9th degree black belt in taekwondo
Chung Dong-hoon (born 1932), South Korean boxer and Olympic athlete
Chung Shin-cho (born 1940), South Korean boxer and Olympic silver medallist
Sun-hwan Chung (born 1940), South Korean Hapkido, Tang Soo Do and taekwondo grandmaster
Chung Ki-young (born 1959), South Korean professional boxer
Chung Hoon (born 1969), South Korean judoka and Olympic bronze medallist
Jung Sun-yong (born 1971), South Korean judoka and Olympic silver medallist
Jung Sung-sook (born 1972), South Korean judoka and Olympic bronze medallist
Jung Bu-kyung (born 1978), South Korean judoka, mixed martial artist and Olympic silver medallist
Jung Jae-eun (born 1980), South Korean taekwondo practitioner and Olympic gold medallist
Jeong Gyeong-mi (born 1985), South Korean judoka and Olympic bronze medallist
Chung Jung-yeon (born 1987), South Korean judoka and Olympic athlete
Robin Cheong (born 1988), South Korean-born New Zealand taekwondo practitioner and Olympic athlete
Joung Da-woon (born 1988), South Korean judoka and Olympic athlete

Fencing
Chung Soo-ki (born 1971), South Korean fencer and Olympic athlete
Jung Gil-ok (born 1980), South Korean foil fencer and Olympic bronze medallist
Jung Seung-hwa (born 1981), South Korean épée fencer 
Jung Hyo-jung (born 1984), South Korean épée fencer and Olympic silver medallist
Jung Jin-sun (born 1984), South Korean épée fencer and Olympic bronze medallist

Handball
Jeung Soon-bok (born 1960), South Korean team handball player and Olympic silver medallist
Jeong Hyoi-soon (born 1964), South Korean team handball player and Olympic silver medallist
Jeong Yi-kyeong (born 1985), South Korean handball player and Olympic bronze medallist
Jung Ji-hae (born 1985), South Korean handball player and Olympic athlete
Jung Su-young (born 1985), South Korean handball player and Olympic athlete
Jung Jin-ho (born 1986), South Korean handball player and Olympic athlete 
Jeong Han (born 1988), South Korean handball player and Olympic athlete
Jung Yu-ra (born 1992), South Korean handball player

Racket sports
Chung Hyun-sook (born 1951 or 1952), South Korean table tennis player
Chung So-young (born 1967), South Korean badminton player and Olympic gold medallist
Chung Hee-seok (born 1977), South Korean tennis player
Jung Jae-sung (1982-2018), South Korean badminton player and Olympic bronze medallist
Jung  Kyung-eun (born 1990), South Korean badminton player and Olympic bronze medallist
Jeoung Young-sik (born 1992), South Korean table tennis player
Chung Hong (born 1993), South Korean tennis player
Chung Hyeon (born 1996), South Korean tennis player
Chung Yun-seong (born 1998), South Korean tennis player

Running
Jong Song-ok (born 1974), North Korean long-distance runner and politician, only North Korean medallist in the history of the World Athletics Championships
Jong Myong-chol (born 1978), North Korean long-distance runner and Olympic athlete
Jong Yong-ok (born 1981), North Korean long-distance runner and Olympic athlete
Chung Yun-hee (born 1983), South Korean long-distance runner and Olympic athlete
Jeong Jin-hyeok (born 1991), South Korean long-distance runner and Olympic athlete

Swimming
Jeong Doo-hee (born 1984), South Korean swimmer and Olympic athlete
Jung Seul-ki (born 1988), South Korean swimmer and Olympic athlete
Jong Yon-hui (born 1989), North Korean synchronised swimmer and Olympic athlete 
Jeong Da-rae (born 1991), South Korean swimmer and Olympic athlete
Jung Won-yong (born 1992), South Korean swimmer and Olympic athlete

Volleyball
Jong Ok-jin (born 1945), North Korean volleyball player and Olympic bronze medallist
Chung Dong-kee (born 1949), South Korean volleyball player and Olympic athlete
Chong Moon-kyong (born 1950), South Korean volleyball player and Olympic athlete
Jung Soon-ok (born 1955), South Korean volleyball player and Olympic bronze medallist
Chung Sun-hye (born 1975), South Korean volleyball player and Olympic athlete 
Jung Dae-young (born 1981), South Korean volleyball player and Olympic athlete
Jeong Min-su (born 1991), South Korean volleyball player
Jong Jin-sim (born 1992), North Korean volleyball player

Wrestling
Jung Soon-won (born 1973), South Korean wrestler and Olympic athlete
Jung Young-ho (born 1982), South Korean freestyle wrestler and Olympic athlete
Jung Ji-hyun (born 1983), South Korean wrestler and Olympic gold medallist
Jong Hak-jin (born 1986), North Korean wrestler
Jong Myong-suk (born 1993), North Korean wrestler

Other athletes
Jeong Gyeong-hun (born 1961), South Korean modern pentathlete and Olympic athlete
Chung Sang-hyun (born 1963), South Korean field hockey player and Olympic silver medallist
Chung Eun-kyung (born 1965), South Korean field hockey player and Olympic silver medallist
Jung Da-yeon (born 1966), South Korean fitness guru and diet writer
Eugene Chung (born 1969), American football offensive tackle and coach of Korean descent
Jung Sung-il (born 1969), South Korean figure skater and Olympic athlete
Jeong Mi (born 1970), South Korean sprint canoer and Olympic athlete
Chung Il-mi (born 1972), South Korean golfer
Chung Jae-hun (born 1974), South Korean archer and Olympic silver medallist
Jung Dong-ho (born 1975), South Korean track-and-field athlete and Paralympic bronze medallist
Alice Jung (born 1982), South Korean-born American BMX racer
Jung Soon-ok (born 1983), South Korean long jumper and Olympic athlete
Jung Sang-jin (born 1984), South Korean javelin thrower
Jong Chun-mi (born 1985), North Korean weightlifter and Olympic athlete
Jeong Ho-won (born 1986), South Korean paralympic boccia player and Paralympic gold medallist 
Jeong Mi-ra (born 1987), South Korean sports shooter and Olympic athlete
Jung Hye-lim (born 1987), South Korean hurdler and Olympic athlete
Jong Yong-hyok (born 1988), North Korean pair skater and Olympic athlete
Jung Dong-hyun (born 1988), South Korean alpine skier and Olympic athlete
Jung Eun-ju (born 1988), South Korean short-track speed skater
Jung Ba-ra (born 1989), South Korean short-track speed skater
Jung Seung-hwan (born 1988), South Korean ice sledge hockey player and Paralympic bronze medallist
Jung Jin-hwa (born 1989), South Korean modern pentathlete and Olympic athlete
David Chung (born 1990), American golfer of Korean descent
Jin Jeong (born Jeong Yeon-jin, 1990), South Korean golfer
Jung Dasomi (born 1990), South Korean archer
Jong Kum-hwa (born 1993), North Korean acrobatic gymnast
Denis Ten (1993-2018), Kazakhstani figure skater of Korean descent and Olympic bronze medallist

See also 
 Korean name
 List of Korean family names
 Jung (disambiguation)

References

Korea-related lists
Korean-language surnames